Lillian Warren, pseudonym Rosalind Brett (fl. 1950s) was a British author who wrote for Mills & Boon romance. As a prolific author of romance novels, she had two other pseudonyms, Kathryn Blair and Celine Conway. At the height of her career, Warren was considered one of publisher's superstars, who set high sales records and a standard for romances published during the 1950s. Joseph McAleer in his book Passion's Fortune: The Story of Mills and Boon, describes Brett's work as so sexy for the era, that it often had to be "watered down". According to McAleer, she is credited by Anne Weale as inventing the "punishing kiss". Brett/Warren came to Mills & Boon from Rich & Cowan, a publisher she felt didn't offer her enough support.

Book notes

Rosalind Brett's romances from the 1950s are historically significant for the Mills & Boon series, by her choice of locations. Her stories take readers away from the British Isles, to East Africa: Rhodesia, Nyasaland, providing glimpses of Salisbury (present day Harare) and Bulawayo, the second city in what is now Zimbabwe. Other locations are French Morocco, Nigeria, South Africa, and the Pacific Islands. The main characters are at work trying to build prosperous lives in what were British, French and Portuguese colonies.

Publishing in post World War II period, Brett writes at the crossroads of history when, colonial rule once paramount in parts of Africa, Asia and the Pacific, would come to be challenged. While her stories depict the colonial life, absent from them is any underlying tension between rulers and subjects.

Bibliography
As Rosalind Brett
Single novels

  Secret Marriage - 1947, ASIN: B000WHQZ2I Amazon Standard Identification Number
  Pagan Interlude - 1947, ASIN: B000WHPKB0 Amazon Standard Identification Number
  For My Sins - 1966, ASIN: B0045B1694 Amazon Standard Identification Number
  A Cottage In Spain - 1955, September 1965 Harlequin Romance #952
  And No Regrets - 1950, Presents, #71 December 1974
  Brittle Bondage - 1951, 1962 (Mills & Boon); July 1969 Harlequin Romance #1319
  Dangerous Waters - 1960, December 1964 Harlequin Romance #877
  Elizabeth Browne, Children's Nurse - April, 1965 Harlequin Romance #908
  Fair Horizon - 1952, 1963 Harlequin Romance #760
  Hotel Mirador - 1959, February 1966 Harlequin Romance #989
  Nurse On Holiday - 1963 Harlequin Romance #740
  Love This Stranger - 1951, Presents, #55 August 1974
  Portrait Of Susan - 1956, December 1963 Harlequin Romance #783
  Stormy Haven - 1952, 1962 Harlequin Romance #656
  Sweet Waters - 1955, February 1964 Harlequin Romance #800
  Tangle In Sunshine - 1957, July 1964 Harlequin Romance #839
  The Bolambo Affair - 1961, August 1967 Harlequin Romance #1131
  The Girl At White Drift - 1962, April 1967 Harlequin Romance #1101
  The Reluctant Guest - 1959, November 1964 Harlequin Romance #869
  They Came To Valeira - 1950, Presents, #43 May 1974
  Too Young To Marry - 1958, September 1964 Harlequin Romance #856
  Towards The Sun - 1953, 1962 Harlequin Romance #693
  Whispering Palms - 1954, 1963 Harlequin Romance #731
  Winds In The Wilderness - 1954, 1963 Harlequin Romance #773
  Winds Of Enchantment - 1954, January 1968 Harlequin Romance #1176
  Young Tracy - 1958, April 1964 Harlequin Romance #815

References

External links
Rosalind Brett's Webpage in Fantastic Fiction's Website

English romantic fiction writers
Possibly living people
Year of birth missing